Jessica Brando (born Jessica Vitelli 6 December 1994) is an Italian singer.

Biography
Born in Grosseto, Tuscany, Jessica started singing at the age of five, studying for her own fun on great singers from the past like Frank Sinatra, Ella Fitzgerald, Dinah Washington and many others.

She started her first band with some teenage friends, making cover versions of 80s dance tracks. Jessica won various local singing contests, pop and jazz, including a scholarship for the Cinecittà Studios. In 2005, she won a scholarship for the Washington School Of Ballet in the United States. At nine years old she was admitted to the Modern Dance Academy of Kledi in Rome. At thirteen she sang for the Pope, John Paul II and appeared on the TV show Il Senso della Vita singing with a band full of Italian jazz superstars.

She attended Liceo classico in Grosseto and also studied piano at Conservatorio.

In 2008, she signed a deal with EMI Music Italy. Jessica completed the recording for her debut EP in 2009, which includes four cover versions revisited in a very personal way.

On 12 January 2010 was officially admitted to the Sanremo Music Festival in the category New Generation with the song Dove non-ci sono ore, written by the singer Valeria Rossi. Brando passes the first turn, entering among the four finalists, but did not win the final.

On 8 May 2010 on the stage of TRL live from Porto Antico in Genoa on MTV Italy, she launched her single Il colore del cuore, accompanied by his band: Daniela Mornati (piano), Francesco Tringali (guitar), Giacomo Tagliavia (bass guitar), Andrea Chircoff (drums). On 12 May, it was shot the official video of the song. The single was included in the album Dimmi cosa sogni, released on 13 July 2010.

Discography

Studio albums
 Jessica Brando, 2009, EMI Music.
 Dimmi cosa sogni, 2010, EMI Music.

Singles
Time Is Running Out, 2009, EMI Music (Muse cover).
Stop and Stare, 2009, EMI Music (OneRepublic cover).
Dove non ci sono ore, 2010, EMI Music.
Il colore del cuore, 2010, EMI Music.
Dimmi cosa sogni, 2010, EMI Music.
Nel blu dipinto di blu, 2012, EMI Music (Domenico Modugno cover).
Sei feat. Davide Dileo, 2012, EMI Music.

References

1994 births
Living people
Italian pop singers
People from Grosseto
21st-century Italian singers
21st-century Italian women singers